Kpando Senior High School formerly known as Kpando Secondary School is a second cycle Co-Ed institution in the Kpando Municipal District of the Volta Region of Ghana. One of the three second cycle schools in the Kpando township and arguably the best Senior High School in the Kpando Municipality as well as in the Volta Region of Ghana.

It runs all the Senior High School Courses approved by the Ghana Education Service.

Kpando Senior High School improves quality teaching and learning due to the availability of facilities ranging from furnished classroom blocks, art studio, science laboratory, well stocked library and staff. In 2016, she ranked at 38th position in the WAEC results rankings.

It has facilities for sports and other extracurricular activities.

History 
The school was founded on 26th January 1953 as a non-denominational secondary school operating out of the Kpando Community Centre with 9 students. At the time, it was called the 'Kpando Day Secondary School' because it was purely a day school. By 1954 there were 66 students, including 2 female students, and 4 members of staff. The staff consisted of Mr F.S. Dzide, Mr. E.K. Asamoa, Mr. F.K. Gollo, and the first headmaster Mr  N.J.C Bowron. The first school building was a temporary structure with asbestos sheet walls completed in 1955 at a cost of £2,263. The first female graduate teacher to join the staff was Mrs M.M.S Tetteh in 1958. In 1967, under the leadership of the then headmaster Mr Purser, the school was granted full boarding status by the Ministry of Education and changed its name to Kpandu Secondary School. In 2023, the Headmaster of the school was Charles Evans Apreku.

Education 
Kpando Senior High School popularly called 'KPASEC' on June 29, 2019, became the first senior high school from the Volta Region to make it to the quarter finals stage of the 2019 National Science & Mathematics Quiz. They beat contenders Kumasi High School and Aburi Girls' Shs in the sixteenth One-Eighth contest.

Notable alumni 

 Emmanuel Yao Adzator - former Director-General of the Ghana Prisons Service
 Joseph Amenowode, Ghanaian politician and academic
 Eric Seddy Kutortse, Founder and Chairman of First Sky Group

References 

Education in Volta Region
Schools in Ghana
Public schools in Ghana
High schools in Ghana